Rosenbergiodendron reflexum is a species of shrub in the family Rubiaceae. It is native to Peru.

References

Flora of Peru
Gardenieae